Acyloxyacyl hydrolase, also known as AOAH, is a protein which in humans is encoded by the AOAH gene.

Function 
Acyloxyacyl hydrolase (AOAH) is a lipase that selectively releases the secondary (acyloxyacyl-linked) fatty acyl chains from the hexaacyl lipid A moiety found in many bacterial lipopolysaccharides (LPSs, also called endotoxins).  The resulting tetraacyl LPS is non-stimulatory and can be a potent inhibitor of LPS sensing via the MD-2--Toll-like Receptor 4 (TLR4).

The enzyme's 2 disulfide-linked subunits are encoded by a single mRNA.  The smaller subunit is a member of the saposin-like (SAPLIP) protein family and the larger subunit, which contains the active site serine, is a GDSL lipase.  The enzyme's 3D structure and catalytic mechanism were reported by Gorelik et al.

AOAH is produced by macrophages (including Kupffer cells and microglia), dendritic cells (especially in the colon), NK cells, ILC1 cells, neutrophils and renal proximal tubule cells.  Absence of the enzyme in genetically engineered mice has been associated with distinctive phenotypes.   AOAH-deficient animals are unable to inactivate even small amounts of LPS in most tissues; the LPS remains bioactive and may pass from cell to cell in vivo for many weeks.   The LPS-exposed mice develop strikingly high titers of polyclonal antibodies, prolonged hepatomegaly, and innate immune "tolerance" that gives them slow and inadequate responses to bacterial challenge. Absence of the enzyme renders mice more likely to develop severe lung injury and die if they are challenged with intratracheal LPS, Gram-negative bacteria, or acid (AOAH may also inactivate oxidized phospholipids). Other studies found that AOAH reduced translocation of stimulatory LPS from the gastrointestinal microbiota to the lung, where it may induce tolerance in alveolar epithelial cells, and also to the liver, where LPS can stimulate inflammation and fat storage (non-alcoholic fatty liver disease). Human eQTL studies have linked AOAH deficiency to both increased risk of colitis and protection from asthma.  A polymorphism in the AOAH gene has been associated with chronic rhinosinusitis in 2 different ethnic groups.

AOAH has been highly conserved through evolution; the amino acid sequence of the human enzyme is almost 50% identical to that of the AOAH found in Dictyostelium discoideum, with 100% identity in the GDSL lipase consensus sequences.  The enzyme has been found in many invertebrates and all vertebrates studied to date except fish.  Although mice have many well-established mechanisms for inhibiting LPS, none has prevented long-term persistence of stimulatory LPS in animals that lack AOAH.

References

External links